The following is a list of events affecting Pakistani television in 2015. Events listed include television show debuts, and finales; channel launches, and closures; stations changing or adding their network affiliations; and information about changes of ownership of channels or stations.

Television Programs debuting in 2015

Hum TV

ARY Digital

Maamta (18 February 2015)
Tumse Mil Kay (19 February 2015)
Ishq Parast (19 February 2015)
Babul Ki Duaein Leti Ja (21 April 2015)
Dil Nahi Manta (15 November 2015)

Weekly Soaps:
Dugdugi (2011)
Family Band (TV series) (2 May 2015)
Madventures (22 February 2013)

Daily Soaps:
Dil-e-Barbad (16 February 2015)
Guriya Rani (6 April 2015)
Mujhe Qubul Hai (27 April 2015)

Serials:
Aitraz (11 August 2015)
Khatoon Manzil (30 July 2015)
Meray dard ki tujhe kya khabar
Mere Ajnabi (29 July 2015)
Mere jeevan sathi
Paiwand (11 April 2015)
Rang Laaga (11 March 2015)
Tere dar par
Woh Ishq Tha Shayed (16 March 2015)
Zinda Dargor (11 May 2015)

Television Programs ending in 2015

Hum TV
Karb (12 October 2015)
Ishq Ibadat (13 October 2015)
Dayar-e-Dil (27 October 2015)
Mol (31 October 2015)
Akeli (5 November 2015)
Kitna Satatay Ho (22 November 2015)
Tum Mere Paas Raho (2 December 2015)
Mohabbat Aag Si (2 December 2015)
Tumhari Natasha (11 December 2015)
Kaisay Tum Se Kahoon (13 December 2015)

ARY Digital
Ishq Parast (23 July 2015)

References